Mats Nyberg may refer to:

 Mats O. Nyberg, Swedish curler
 Mats Nyberg (sailor), Swedish sailor